Henri Padou (15 May 1898 – 19 November 1981) was a French water polo player and freestyle swimmer. He competed in water polo at the 1920, 1924, 1928 and 1936 Summer Olympics and finished in 9th, 1st, 3rd and 4th place, respectively. In 1920 and 1924 he also took part in the 100 m and 4 × 200 m swimming events, but failed to reach the finals. In 1970 he was inducted into the International Swimming Hall of Fame in the category water polo.

His son Henri Padou Jr. was an Olympic swimmer.

See also
 France men's Olympic water polo team records and statistics
 List of Olympic champions in men's water polo
 List of Olympic medalists in water polo (men)
 List of players who have appeared in multiple men's Olympic water polo tournaments
 List of members of the International Swimming Hall of Fame

References

External links

 

1898 births
1981 deaths
Sportspeople from Tourcoing
French male water polo players
Olympic water polo players of France
Olympic swimmers of France
Swimmers at the 1920 Summer Olympics
Swimmers at the 1924 Summer Olympics
Water polo players at the 1920 Summer Olympics
Water polo players at the 1924 Summer Olympics
Water polo players at the 1928 Summer Olympics
Water polo players at the 1936 Summer Olympics
Olympic gold medalists for France
Olympic bronze medalists for France
Olympic bronze medalists in swimming
Olympic medalists in water polo
French male freestyle swimmers
Medalists at the 1928 Summer Olympics
Medalists at the 1924 Summer Olympics
Olympic gold medalists in swimming